Events in the year 1754 in Norway.

Incumbents
Monarch: Frederick V

Events

 The Hanseatic League Kontor at Bryggen was closed.

Arts and literature

Budal Church was built.

Births

4 October – Mathias Bonsak Krogh, bishop and politician (died 1828).

Full date unknown
Peder Hjermann, farmer and politician (died 1834).
Andreas Rogert, jurist and politician (died 1833).

Deaths

Hans Colbjørnsen, timber trader and military officer (born c.1675).
Torsten Ottersen Hoff, sculptor (born c.1688).

See also

References